Synclera traducalis, the variegated pearl,  is a species of moth in the family Crambidae. It is found in Sweden, Bulgaria, Cyprus, the Canary Islands, Israel, the Palestinian Territories, Lebanon, Syria, Saudi Arabia, the United Arab Emirates, Yemen, Egypt, Mali, Senegal, Equatorial Guinea, South Africa, La Réunion, India and Sri Lanka.

Foodplants
The larvae feed on Gouania polygama, Ziziphus jujuba and Ziziphus mauritiana.

References

External links
 Swedish Museum of Natural History - picture of the holotype
 africanmoths.com - pictures of Synclera traducalis

Moths described in 1852
Spilomelinae
Moths of Africa
Moths of Réunion
Moths of Asia
Moths of the Middle East
Moths of Europe